Sakhi Gokhale (born 27 July 1993) is a Marathi television and theatre actress. She known for her portrayed in Dil Dosti Duniyadari as Reshma Inamdar and Dil Dosti Dobara as Pari.

Early life and education
Gokhale attended Sahyadri School until grade 10. She later pursued a Bachelor of Arts at Ruparel College. She also has interest in dancing and has attended workshops by Shiamak Davar. Her mother gifted her a DSLR after she finished her school education, which cultivated in her an interest in still photography. She then pursued a degree in Fashion and Fine Arts Photography from Bharti Vidyapeeth's School of Photography, Pune, going on to intern as a photographer under the guidance of Jaideep Oberoi, before getting into acting.

As of July 2018, she was pursuing a master's degree in Art Curation in the UK at the Royal College of Art.

Career
Gokhale began her television career by appearing in a few Hindi advertisements. She played a small role, Venu, in the Hindi movie, Rangrezz in 2013. She was also part of a one-act play before being cast as Reshma Inamdar in Dil Dosti Duniyadari. After the show ended, she was also seen in the theatrical play, Amar Photo Studio. She was awarded Fresh Face of the Year by Maharashtra Times in 2017. She was also part of the reboot sequel to Dil Dosti Duniyadari, Dil Dosti Dobara as Pari, along with the old cast. She also played the role of Seema in Pimpal (2017). She has also written articles in Maitrin for the newspaper Sakal Pune. She has also done still photography for the poster of the play Laginghai.

In 2020, she was appointed as Creative Director at Aayaam, a concept alternative arts venue in Pune.

Personal life
Sakhee is not the niece of actor Vikram Gokhle. These are rumors she said.
Sakhi Gokhale is the daughter of actors Mohan Gokhale and Shubhangi Gokhale. She is very close to her mother. She married her Dil Dosti Duniyadari co-star, Suvrat Joshi, on 11 April 2019.

Filmography

Films

Television

References

External links
 

Actresses from Pune
Marathi actors
Living people
1994 births
Indian television actresses